Uberto Dell'Orto (January 6, 1848 – November 29, 1895) was an Italian painter, mainly of landscapes.

Biography
He was born and died in Milan. He was initially trained as an engineer, then learned art under Giovanni Battista Lelli and Eleuterio Pagliano. He painted mainly mountain landscapes.

Sources

1848 births
1895 deaths
19th-century Italian painters
Italian male painters
Painters from Milan
Italian landscape painters
Brera Academy alumni
19th-century Italian male artists